Redea is a commune in Olt County, Oltenia, Romania. It is composed of three villages: Redea, Redișoara and Valea Soarelui.

References

Communes in Olt County
Localities in Oltenia